Dick Clark (1929–2012) was an American entertainer and producer.

Dick Clark may also refer to:

 Dick Clark (senator) (born 1928), U.S. senator from Iowa
 Dick Clark (Florida politician) (1933–2019), American politician in Florida
 Dick Clark (basketball) (1944–1988), American basketball player
 Dick Clark (architect) (1944–2017), American architect

See also
 Richard Clark (disambiguation)
 Richard Clarke (disambiguation)